
Year 276 BC was a year of the pre-Julian Roman calendar. At the time it was known as the Year of the Consulship of Gurges and Clepsina (or, less frequently, year 478 Ab urbe condita). The denomination 276 BC for this year has been used since the early medieval period, when the Anno Domini calendar era became the prevalent method in Europe for naming years.

Events 
 By place 
 Egypt 
 The Egyptian King Ptolemy II's first wife, Arsinoe I (daughter of the late King Lysimachus of Thrace) is accused, probably at instigation of Ptolemy II's sister (who also has the name Arsinoe), of plotting his murder and is exiled by the King. Arsinoe then marries her own brother, a customary practice in Egypt, but scandalous to the Greeks. The suffix "Philadelphoi" ("Brother-Loving") consequently is added to the names of King Ptolemy II and Queen Arsinoe II. The former queen, Arsinoe I, is banished to Coptos, a city of Upper Egypt near the Wadi Hammamat, while her rival adopts her children.
 The first of the Syrian Wars starts between Egypt's Ptolemy II and Seleucid emperor Antiochus I Soter. The Egyptians invade northern Syria, but Antiochus defeats and repels his opponent's army.

 Sicily 
 Pyrrhus negotiates with the Carthaginians to end the fighting between them in Sicily. The Carthaginians are inclined to come to terms with Pyrrhus, but he demands that Carthage abandon all of Sicily and make the Libyan Sea the boundary between Carthage and the Greeks. Meanwhile, he begins to display despotic behaviour towards the Sicilian Greeks and soon Sicilian opinion moves against him. Therefore, fearing that his successes in Sicily may lead him to become the despot of their country, the Syracusans ask Pyrrhus to leave Sicily. He does so, and returns to the Italian mainland, noting that he expects Sicily to be a "fair wrestling ring" for Carthage and Rome.

China
 General Bai Qi of the State of Qin attacks the State of Wei and captures two cities.
 General Lian Po of the State of Zhou captures the Wei city of Qi.

Births 
 Eratosthenes, Greek mathematician, geographer and astronomer (d. 194 BC)

Deaths

References